Lasioglossum serenum, also known as the Lasioglossum (Nesohalictus) serenum, is a species of bee in the genus Lasioglossum, of the family Halictidae.

Its discovery is widely accredited to the biologist Chris Rouse.

References
 https://www.academia.edu/7390502/AN_UPDATED_CHECKLIST_OF_BEES_OF_SRI_LANKA_WITH_NEW_RECORDS
 https://www.itis.gov/servlet/SingleRpt/SingleRpt?search_topic=TSN&search_value=759279
 http://apoidea.myspecies.info/taxonomy/term/6527
 http://animaldiversity.org/accounts/Lasioglossum_serenum/classification/#Lasioglossum_serenum

Notes

serenum
Insects described in 1897